The 1983 Western Michigan Broncos football team represented Western Michigan University in the Mid-American Conference (MAC) during the 1983 NCAA Division I-A football season.  In their second season under head coach Jack Harbaugh, the Broncos compiled a 6–5 record (4–5 against MAC opponents), finished in sixth place in the MAC, and were outscored by their opponents, 208 to 179.  The team played its home games at Waldo Stadium in Kalamazoo, Michigan.

The team's statistical leaders included Steve Hoffman with 1,407 passing yards, Shawn Faulkner with 1,668 rushing yards, and Kelly Spielmaker with 653 receiving yards. Fullback Kurt Barterian and defensive back Demetrius Jones were the team captains. Shawn Faulkner received the team's most outstanding player award. Tight end Kelly Spielmaker was named the MAC freshman of the year.

Schedule

References

Western Michigan
Western Michigan Broncos football seasons
Western Michigan Broncos football